Zambīia, dza-am-bi-ia, c. 1774 – 1772 BC (short chronology) or c. 1836 – 1834 BC (middle chronology), was the 11th king of the 1st Dynasty of Isin. He is best known for his defeat at the hands of Sin-iqišam, king of Larsa.

Biography

According to the Sumerian King List, Zambīia reigned for 3 years. He was a contemporary of Sin-iqišam king of Larsa, whose fifth and final year-name celebrates his victory over Zambīia: “year the army of (the land of) Elam (and Zambīia (the king of Isin),) was/were defeated by arms,” suggesting a confederation between Isin and Elam against Larsa. The city of Nippur was hotly contested between the city-states. If Zambīia survived this battle, he may have possibly gone on to be contemporary with Sin-iqišam’s successors, Ṣilli-Adad and Warad-Sin.

A single inscription is known for this king, on cone fragments, which reads:

A votive dedication to the goddess Nanše on behalf of Zambīia was copied from an inscription on a bronze buck.

External links
Zambīia year-names at CDLI.

Inscriptions

References

 

Amorite kings
19th-century BC Sumerian kings
18th-century BC Sumerian kings
Dynasty of Isin
19th-century BC people
18th-century BC people